Mecistocephalus is a genus of centipedes in the family Mecistocephalidae. It was described by British entomologist George Newport in 1843. Centipedes in this genus are found mainly in tropical and subtropical regions of south and east Asia, but some are also found in some temperate areas and in the Americas.

Description
Centipedes in this genus range from 2 cm to 10 cm in length and usually have 45 to 51 pairs of legs (but some have more, up to as many as 101 leg pairs). Most species in this genus have 49 pairs of legs (e.g., Mecistocephalus punctifrons and M. pallidus), but some species have 51 pairs (e.g., M. sechellarum and M. lifuensis), 47 pairs (e.g., M. angusticeps and M. tahitiensis), or 45 pairs (e.g., M. nannocornis and M. spissus). Intraspecific variation in the number of leg-bearing segments within each sex has been recorded among the species with the greatest number of legs in this genus: M. diversisternus, which has 57 or 59 leg pairs, M. japonicus, which has 63 or 65 leg pairs, and M. microporus, which has odd numbers of leg pairs ranging from 93 to 101, the maximum number in the family Mecistocephalidae.

Species
There are about 145 valid species, including:
 Mecistocephalus collinus Verhoeff, 1937
 Mecistocephalus furculigera (Verhoeff, 1925)
 Mecistocephalus gracilis (Verhoeff, 1925)
 Mecistocephalus heteropus Humbert, 1865
 Mecistocephalus kurandanus Chamberlin, 1920
 Mecistocephalus mater (Verhoeff, 1925)
 Mecistocephalus punctifrons Newport, 1843
 Mecistocephalus simplex Chamberlin, 1920
 Mecistocephalus subinsularis (Silvestri, 1919)
 Mecistocephalus tahitiensis Wood, 1862

References

 

 
 
Centipede genera
Animals described in 1843
Taxa named by George Newport